Surujdath Mahabir (born 27 October 1962) is a Trinidadian cricketer. He played in one List A and two first-class matches for Trinidad and Tobago in 1993/94.

He is the general secretary of the Trinidad and Tobago Cricket Board.

See also
 List of Trinidadian representative cricketers

References

External links
 

1962 births
Living people
Trinidad and Tobago cricketers
Trinidad and Tobago people of Indian descent